Mañana te cuento is a 2005 Peruvian romantic comedy-drama film written and directed by Eduardo Mendoza de Echave in his directorial debut. Starring Melania Urbina, Milene Vásquez, Angie Jibaja, Bruno Ascenzo, Oscar Beltrán, Jason Day and José Manuel Peláez. It premiered on June 2, 2005, in Peruvian theaters.

Synopsis 
In search of making a sexual debut, 4 young people turn to the advertisements that abound in the newspapers and contact three prostitutes through the Internet. These are A1 girls, whose services are expensive. In the course of a whole night they will experience more than one incident.

Cast 
The actors participating in this film are:

 Melania Urbina as Bibiana
 Milene Vásquez as Carla
 Angie Jibaja as Gabriela
 Bruno Ascenzo as Manuel
 Oscar Beltrán as Efraín
 Jason Day as Juan Diego
 José Manuel Peláez as "El Gordo"
 Sandra Vergara as Mari Pilí
 Carolina Caro as Daniela
 Norka Ramírez as Margarita

Reception 
Mañana te cuento managed to attract 288,242 viewers throughout its career in theaters, becoming the third highest grossing Peruvian film at the time.

Sequel 
After the success of the film, a sequel called Mañana te cuento 2 was released on February 14, 2008, in Peruvian theaters.

References

External links 

 

2005 films
2005 romantic comedy-drama films
Peruvian romantic comedy-drama films
2000s Spanish-language films
2000s Peruvian films
Films set in Peru
Films shot in Peru
Films about friendship
Films about prostitution
Films about virginity
2005 directorial debut films